Bamta is a panchayat in Chopal in the district of Shimla, Himachal Pradesh, India.

Geography
Bamta lies in the south-western ranges of the
Himalayas at 31.01917°N 77.62028°E. It has an average altitude of 2,400 metres above mean sea level. Upper parts of Bamta are surrounded by forests of chir pine and gigantic deodars, and lower areas have sharp-edged mountain slopes close to the river. Geographically Bamta Valley falls between the Kuppar peak in the north and Shalvi and Naarti rivers (subsidiaries of Yamuna river) in the south. Bamta Panchayat shares its boundary with Podia (another village in Throch valley of Chaupal) in the east, with Matal village (part of famous apple belt Madaog) in the west, and in the south Shalvi River creates a natural border between Dewat and Bamta Panchayat.

Jhiknipul, Naar and Thali and are the major villages in the lower heights close to the river valley. Here a large portion of cultivable land is irrigated with the river water (kulh). In the middle belt, major villages are Bajroth, Bhabhar, Badhola, Chadholi, Ghurla and Rupari. In these villages, much of the cultivable land is apple orchards, and a large area is under the waste land (Ghasin, common land in the Himalayan region usually used for livestock grazing). In the higher belt, the major villages are Bamta itself along with Kashah, Thothia, Mamvi and Shangroli, major apple producing areas in the valley.

Population 
Bamta is a medium-sized village in Chaupal of Shimla district, Himachal Pradesh, with 89 families. The Bamta village has population of 386, 190 males and 196 females per Population Census 2011. In Bamta village the population of children age 0-6 is 38, 9.84% of the total population. Other than Bamta villages it is also one the largest panchayat in tehsil chaupal. Average sex Ratio of Bamta panchayat is 1032 which is higher than Himachal Pradesh state average of 972.

Education 
Gsss Bamta (lani) 
GSSS BAMTA SCHOOL was established in year 1964.
School is approved for Upper Primary, Secondary, Senior Secondary and working under the management of Department of Education. Primary medium of education in GSSS Bamta school is Hindi language and school is co-educational.

List of notable schools nearby -

1. GPS Bamta, Primary (Govt.)

2. GSSS Bamta, Sr. Secondary (Govt.)

3. GPS Charoli, Primary (Govt.)

4. GMS Ghurla, Upper Primary (Govt.)

5. GPS Ghurla, Primary (Govt.)

6. GPS Kashah, Primary (Govt.)

7. GPS Mamvi, Primary (Govt.)

8. GPS Rupari, Primary (Govt.)

9. GPS Shangroli, Primary (Govt.)

Literacy rate 
Bamta village has a higher literacy rate than most of Himachal Pradesh. In 2011, it was 84.20% compared to 82.80% of Himachal Pradesh. In Bamta male literacy stands at 90.42% while female literacy rate was 78.45%.

History 
Historically Bamta was the part of the Jubbal State and one of the economically and strategically important part of the state. It connects the Jubbal state with its southern part, and the largest forest area of the state also falls in Bamta region. After independence, Bamta was created as separate panchayat in Chopal tehsil.

Climate 
The region is generally cool throughout the year with temperatures ranging from 19 °C (66 °F) to 28 °C ( 82 °F) during the summer and between −10 °C (14 °F) to 18 °C (64 °F) in winter. The winters are especially harsh and snowfall is frequent.

Bamta receives heavy snowfall during winter season.
(4.5 ft. In villages and 7 ft. at higher peaks - 2013)

Tourist attractions 

Kurna Park
Churtha Heights
Gallu Mountain
Cricket Ground Ghurla
Chhatar hill

Villages 

● Bamta (7874 feet)

● Kashah (7545 feet)

● Lani (7677 feet)

● Shangroli (8202 feet)

● Jagrah (7677 feet)

● Mamvi (8202 feet)

● Pujali (7611 feet)

● Bhabhar (6561 feet)

● Ghurla

● Karali, kashah (8312 feet)

● Bajhroth

● Rupari

● Thotiya ( 7859 meter)

● Kunjli (6889 feet)

● Throli (7874 feet)

● Nar

● Rawtan (5000 feet)

● Jhiknipul (4790 feet)

List of famous temples in Bamta panchayt 

◆ Durga Mata Mandir, Bamta

◆ Lankerveer Mandir, Bamta

◆ Mahasu Devta, Ghurla

◆ Kali Mata Mandir, Kashah

◆ Dakreyi Devta Mandir,  Pujali

◆ Naag Devta Mandir, Bhabhar

Transportation 

Bamta is well connected by road from Shimla via Chaupal, the distance is 135 km and distance via Maraog is 102 km.
A road from Kharaphattar to Bamta (18.5 km) is under construction.

Nearby places 

-  Jubbal

- Maraog

- Chopal

- Kharapathar

- Nerwa (Chaupal), Shimla

References

Shimla district